Ahmed Mian Soomro (Sindhi: احمد میاں سومرو;) was a Pakistani politician who belonged to a political family from Sindh province that has been active in public life since 1923.

Career
He belonged to District Jaccobabad of Sindh Province.  He served as Deputy Speaker and Senior Deputy Speaker of the West Pakistan Assembly (June 12, 1965 to Mar 25, 1969); he was a member of the Senate and helped to establish the Senate Committee Systems. He remained active in local politics at District level.

Family
He has three wife's Begum Razia Soomro, Begum Saeeda Soomro and Begum Sarwat un nisa Soomro and three children named as Mr Mohammed Mian Soomro (son) Mrs Maliha Malik (daughter ) and Mrs Sarah Soomro (daughter)

His son, Muhammad Mian Soomro, has held various positions in national and international organisations. He also held various top level political positions and served as Governor Of Sindh (2000–2002), Chairman Senate of Pakistan (2003–2007), Caretaker Prime Minister of Pakistan (2007–2008) Acting President of Pakistan (2008), and Chairman Senate of Pakistan (2008–2009)

References

Date of birth missing (living people)
Living people
Political families of Pakistan
Politicians from Sindh
Ahmed Mian
Year of birth missing (living people)
Members of the Provincial Assembly of West Pakistan
Deputy Speakers of the Provincial Assembly of West Pakistan